Elgin—Middlesex—London is a federal electoral district in Ontario, Canada, that has been represented in the House of Commons of Canada since 1997.

It was created in 1996 from Elgin—Norfolk, Lambton—Middlesex, and London—Middlesex ridings. This riding lost territory to London—Fanshawe during the 2012 electoral redistribution.

Demographics 
According to the 2021 Canada Census

Ethnic groups: 88.9% White, 2.9% Indigenous, 1.9% South Asian, 1.7% Arab, 1.5% Black

Languages: 84.1% English, 2.9% German, 1.8% Plautdietsch

Religions: 59.0% Christian (17.9% Catholic, 8.7% United Church, 4.2% Anglican, 3.3% Baptist, 2.8% Anabaptist, 2.3% Presbyterian, 1.1% Reformed, 1.0% Pentecostal, 17.7% Other), 2.6% Muslim, 36.7% None

Median income: $42,400 (2020)

Average income: $51,250 (2020)

Members of Parliament

This riding has elected the following Members of Parliament:

Election results

Note: Conservative vote is compared to the total of the Canadian Alliance vote and Progressive Conservative vote in 2000 election.

	

Note: Canadian Alliance vote is compared to the Reform vote in 1997 election.

See also
 List of Canadian federal electoral districts
 Past Canadian electoral districts

References

Federal riding history from the Library of Parliament
2011 Results from Elections Canada
 Campaign expense data from Elections Canada

Notes

External links
 Website of the Parliament of Canada
 Website of the Conservative Party Electoral District Association for Elgin-Middlesex-London

Ontario federal electoral districts
Politics of London, Ontario
St. Thomas, Ontario